St. Clement's Chapel, also known as St. Clement's Chapel of the Church of the Advent, is a historic Carpenter Gothic style Episcopal church building located at 815 Piedmont Drive in Tallahassee, Leon County, Florida. It was designed and built in 1890 by William Betton as St. Clement's Episcopal Church,  to the east in Lloyd in Jefferson County, and was named for the church of the same name in Manhattan, New York. Dedicated by Bishop Edwin Gardner Weed of the Episcopal Diocese of Florida in 1895, it was a small but active congregation in Lloyd, until dwindling membership and the need for extensive repairs forced its deactivation in November 1958. In June 1959, it was given to the fledgling Church of the Advent in Tallahassee and was moved to its present location that summer and renovated. It was rededicated on Advent Sunday, November 29, 1959. The Church of the Advent used the building as its main place of worship until 1996, when it was replaced by an adjacent, more modern, and larger building. St. Clement's Chapel is still used for the 8:00 A.M. Sunday services as well as for weddings and other events. Unlike many Carpenter Gothic style Episcopal churches in Florida, St. Clement's Chapel has all of its original furnishings.

References

External links

Church of the Advent website
Church of the Advent at Episcopal Diocese of Florida

Historic buildings and structures in Leon County, Florida
Churches in Tallahassee, Florida
Buildings and structures in Jefferson County, Florida
Episcopal church buildings in Florida
Carpenter Gothic church buildings in Florida
Relocated buildings and structures in Florida
Churches completed in 1890
19th-century Episcopal church buildings
Churches in Leon County, Florida
1890 establishments in Florida
Chapels in the United States